Schwimmverein Blau-Weiß Bochum von 1896 e.V. is a German water polo and swimming club from Bochum.

Its women's team has dominated the Deutsche Wasserball-Liga throughout the past decade, winning every title since 2000. It is a regular in the European Cup.

Titles
 Wasserball-Liga
 2000, 2001, 2002, 2003, 2004, 2005, 2006, 2007, 2008, 2009, 2010, 2011
 Wasserball-Pokal
 1996, 2002, 2003, 2004, 2005, 2006, 2008, 2009, 2010, 2011

References

LEN Women's Champions' Cup clubs
Sport in Bochum
Water polo clubs in Germany